Michael Collins (born 16 September 1977) is a Northern Irish retired professional footballer who last played for Irish League club Crusaders.

Early career
Collins started his career at Cliftonville, before leaving for unsuccessful spells in England with Sheffield United and Darlington, before returning to Cliftonville in 1996.

Cliftonville
Collins was an integral part of the Reds side that won the Irish League title in 1998 – the first time the club had been champions in 88 years.

Three years later an incident during an UEFA Intertoto Cup tie brought his time with the club to an end. Collins had already been sent-off when he head-butted an opponent on his way off the pitch  Laurence Stitt, the manager at the time, suspended Collins and put him on the transfer list.

Portadown
He then joined Portadown and won the league in his first season at Shamrock Park, followed by the Irish Cup three years later.

Unfortunately, Reds boss Ronnie McFall began to see his services as an unaffordable luxury, such was the regularity of his run-ins with officials. He was forced to substitute Collins in a pre season friendly against his old club Sheffield United F.C. in July 2008. Collins returned from a lengthy ban to see red in his first and only 2007–08 Irish League Cup appearance. He famously pushed IFA referee Alan Black in the chest after being sent off for elbowing Newry City's Stephen Ferguson and was given a lengthy suspension. Such was his fiery temper, McFall finally lost patience with him and he was made available to other clubs.

He was also sent off at VMFD Žalgiris Vilnius in the 2004–05 UEFA Cup

Newry City
In December 2007 Newry City ironically stepped in to avail of his assets. He was given a one-and-a-half-year contract.

His first game was in the reserves where he scored the winner against former club Cliftonville. He was then drafted into the first team and settled into the centre midfield position. He became a very important player and helped Newry to one of their best ever runs in the league.

Dundalk
Collins' contract ended in February 2009 and was subsequently signed by Dundalk. However, he failed to get international clearance and was prevented from playing competitively until July. He did play in several pre-season friendlies, including the annual Jim Malone Cup match against Drogheda, where he was sent off early in the first half after clashing with Gavin Whelan. He finally played for the Lilywhites against Derry City and was influential as they won 1–0. He scored twice in a match versus Galway United which they comfortably won 3–0 at Terryland Park. He also started the following week in the 4–2 win against Drogheda United and Dundalk's good form at the present is largely thanks to Collins' contribution. Collins' was released at the end of Dundalk's season by the board after the manager Sean Connor's contract was not renewed.

Crusaders
He signed for Crusaders on 20 November 2009. He made his debut against old club Portadown on 2 January, and helped the side to the County Antrim Shield. He scored his only goal against Coleraine on 23 January. However, he was released after just four months for financial reasons. After having preliminary talks with Donegal Celtic prior to the 2010–11 season, he decided to retire from football.

Honours
Irish League: 2
 Cliftonville 1997/98
 Portadown 2001/2002
Irish Cup
 Portadown 2004/05
County Antrim Shield
Crusaders 2009/10

References

External links

 Referee pushed after handing out red card
Mickey starts in style
Newry boss Flynn in Collins plea
Collins set to make Lilywhites debut
Collins double sinks Tribesmen
Dundalk win Louth derby

Living people
1977 births
Association footballers from Northern Ireland
Coleraine F.C. players
Darlington F.C. players
Cliftonville F.C. players
Portadown F.C. players
Newry City F.C. players
Dundalk F.C. players
Crusaders F.C. players
NIFL Premiership players
League of Ireland players
English Football League players
Association football midfielders